Steen Township is one of ten townships in Knox County, Indiana. As of the 2010 census, its population was 900 and it contained 394 housing units.

History
Steen Township was founded in 1857. It was named for Richard Steen, a pioneer settler.

Andrew Nicholson Farmstead was added to the National Register of Historic Places in 2005.

Geography

References

External links
 Indiana Township Association
 United Township Association of Indiana

Townships in Knox County, Indiana
Townships in Indiana
1857 establishments in Indiana